Petar Karaklajić (Serbian Cyrillic: Петар Караклајић; born 1 February 2000) is a Serbian professional footballer who plays as a winger for Greek Super League 2 club Panachaiki.

Career

AEK Athens
On 7 August 2020, AEK have unveiled the signing of Petar Karaklajić, with the Serbian prospect penning a five-year deal for an undisclosed fee. Karaklajić mainly plays on the left wing. The 20-year-old attacker impressed with Proleter Novi Sad in the 2019–20 Serbian SuperLiga campaign, tallying three assists in nine matches and AEK's technical director Ilija Ivić has signed Karaklajić with a view to the future.

Career statistics

References

2000 births
Living people
Serbian footballers
Serbian SuperLiga players
Super League Greece players
FK Brodarac players
FK Proleter Novi Sad players
AEK Athens F.C. players
Serbian expatriate footballers
Expatriate footballers in Greece
Association football forwards